Jake Dengler (born October 14, 1999) is an American soccer player who plays as a defender for South Georgia Tormenta in the USL League One.

Career

Youth, College & Amateur
Dengler attended The John Carroll School, and played club soccer for both Pipeline Soccer Club and later for Baltimore Armour, winning the USYSA State Cup, Regional and National Champion with Pipeline in 2016. He was named to the 2016-17 USSDA Best XI and captained Armour to their first playoff appearance, scoring six goals in 26 games.

In 2017, Dengler attended Community College of Baltimore County to play college soccer. Dengler had a successful single season with the Knights, making 20 appearances, scoring 11 goals and tallying three assists, helping the team to All Region XX Championship and Maryland JUCO Championship. Dengler was also named  NJCAA All-America, United Soccer Coaches All-East Region First Team, Region XX First Team and Maryland JUCO First team honors in his freshman season.

Dengler transferred to Loyola University Maryland in 2018, making 16 appearances and scoring one goal. 2019 saw Dengler transfer again, this time to the University of Connecticut, going to make another 16 college appearances and scoring two goals.

While at college, Dengler played in the National Premier Soccer League for FC Baltimore Christos, scoring four goals in 17 appearances over both the 2018 and 2019 seasons.

Professional
On January 13, 2020, Dengler signed his first professional contract, joining USL Championship club Loudoun United ahead of their 2020 season. Dengler was named to the bench on August 2, 2020 in a game against Philadelphia Union II, but never made an appearance for the club.

Dengler joined NISA club Maryland Bobcats, making 23 appearances for the club and was named the club's Most Valuable Player.

On January 28, 2022, Dengler signed with USL League One side South Georgia Tormenta.

References

External links 
 

1999 births
Living people
American soccer players
Association football defenders
Loudoun United FC players
Loyola Greyhounds men's soccer players
Maryland Bobcats FC players
National Independent Soccer Association players
National Premier Soccer League players
Soccer players from Maryland
Sportspeople from Baltimore
Tormenta FC players
UConn Huskies men's soccer players
USL League One players